Anton Eberhard (November 9, 1892 – June 3, 1967) was a German politician of the Free Democratic Party (FDP) and former member of the German Bundestag.

Life 
He was a member of the Rhineland-Palatinate state parliament from 1951 to 1953 and was chairman of the FDP faction there in 1951/52. He was a member of the German Bundestag from October 3, 1952, when he succeeded Wilhelm Nowack, who had been appointed Minister of Finance of Rhineland-Palatinate, until 1957, and again from November 4, 1959, when he succeeded Fritz Glahn, who had resigned, until 1961. He always entered parliament via the FDP state list for Rhineland-Palatinate.

Literature

References

1892 births
1967 deaths
Members of the Bundestag for Rhineland-Palatinate
Members of the Bundestag 1957–1961
Members of the Bundestag 1953–1957
Members of the Bundestag 1949–1953
Members of the Bundestag for the Free Democratic Party (Germany)
Members of the Landtag of Rhineland-Palatinate